Roger Verhaes (8 May 1920 – 1 May 1999) was a Belgian athlete. He competed in the men's shot put and the men's discus throw at the 1948 Summer Olympics.

References

1920 births
1999 deaths
Athletes (track and field) at the 1948 Summer Olympics
Belgian male shot putters
Belgian male discus throwers
Olympic athletes of Belgium
Place of birth missing